Inchconnachan (Innis Chonachain in Gaelic, meaning 'The Colquhoun's Island') is an island in Loch Lomond in Scotland, in the Trossachs National Park. It is accessible by boat from the village of Luss on the south side of the Loch.

The island is uninhabited and is an Area of Special Scientific Interest and a Special Area of Conservation.

Wallabies 

Wallabies, of the species Macropus rufogriseus (Red-necked Wallaby), were introduced by Fiona Gore, Countess of Arran in the 1940s, and still roam wild. It is one of the very few places outside Australia which has a viable population of wallabies.

Sale
On 9 July 2020, Inchconnachan was put up for sale by the Colquhoun family, at a price of over £500,000. It was sold to Soho House founder, Nick Jones and his wife, Kirsty Young.

The sale included a derelict colonial-style timber bungalow dating from the 1920s, built for the tea merchant Admiral Sullivan, which was later the holiday home of the family of Fiona Gore, Countess of Arran. Planning consent and detailed architectural drawings are in place to replace the bungalow with a new four-bedroom lodge and one-bedroom warden's house, along with a boat house and pier.

References

External links
 https://web.archive.org/web/20090710015304/http://lochlomond-islands.com/
article which mentions it
Inchconnachan 2009

Connachan
Sites of Special Scientific Interest in Scotland
Uninhabited islands of Argyll and Bute